Urena lobata, commonly known as Caesarweed or Congo jute, is a tender perennial, variable, erect, ascendant shrub or subshrub measuring up to  to  tall. The stems are covered with minute, star-like hairs and often tinged purple. Considered a weed, it is widely distributed in the tropics, including in Brazil and Southeast Asia.

Description 
Each individual plant grows as a single stalk that freely sends out bushy stems. The leaf shape is palmately lobed (having lobes that spread out like fingers on a hand). Like the stem, the leaves also have tiny hairs. Flowers of the plant are pink-violet and grow one centimeter in width. The fruit is also hairy and may stick to clothing or fur.

Invasiveness 

The plant can invade areas of ecological disturbance as well as eroded places, crop plantations, and pastures. Caesarweed is considered an invasive species in the state of Florida, United States. There it grows as an annual in most areas except for in the southern region, where it may live perennially. The plant is not competitive in tall grasses or under canopies.

The University of Florida's pest management procedures for handling this plant include prevention through treating before seeds form and maneuvering vehicles to avoid driving near Caesarweed, mulching and shading to prevent germination, and the use of chemical herbicides.

Aguaxima in L'Encyclopédie

In the Encyclopédie ou Dictionnaire raisonné des sciences, des arts et des métiers (Vol. 1 [1751], p. 191), Denis Diderot's article about the plant is listed under the heading Aguaxima, a common Portuguese name for the plant. The entry is notable not for its one-sentence description of its subject ("Aguaxima, a plant growing in Brazil and on the islands of South America."), but for Diderot's editorializing that follows it. Frustrated by the uselessness of such a poor article, he muses about what audience it could possibly serve. His conclusion is a succinct critique of the popular assumption that encyclopedias should be measured according to their breadth or comprehensiveness rather than quality.

Aguaxima, a plant growing in Brazil and on the islands of South America. This is all that we are told about it; and I would like to know for whom such descriptions are made. It cannot be for the natives of the countries concerned, who are likely to know more about the aguaxima than is contained in this description, and who do not need to learn that the aguaxima grows in their country. It is as if you said to a Frenchman that the pear tree is a tree that grows in France, in Germany, etc . It is not meant for us either, for what do we care that there is a tree in Brazil named aguaxima, if all we know about it is its name? What is the point of giving the name? It leaves the ignorant just as they were and teaches the rest of us nothing. If all the same I mention this plant here, along with several others that are described just as poorly, then it is out of consideration for certain readers who prefer to find nothing in a dictionary article or even to find something stupid than to find no article at all.

References

External links

Hibisceae
Flora of Central America
Flora of the Caribbean
Flora of South America
Flora of tropical Asia
Flora of Australia
Flora of China
Plants described in 1753
Taxa named by Carl Linnaeus
Encyclopédie
Flora without expected TNC conservation status
BOB